The 1949 Latin Cup was the first edition of the annual Latin Cup which was played by clubs of the Southwest European nations of France, Italy, Portugal, and Spain. The tournament was hosted by Spain, and the Spanish club FC Barcelona was the winner of the tournament after defeating Sporting CP by a score of 2–1 in the final match.

Participating teams

Venues 

The host of the tournament was Spain, and three stadiums, two in Madrid and one in Barcelona, were selected to host the matches for the tournament.

Tournament

Bracket

Semifinals

Third place match

Final

Goalscorers

References

External links 

 Latin Cup (Full Results) from RSSSF

Latin Cup
Latin Cup, 1949
Latin Cup
Latin Cup